The Osaka derby is a commonly occurring football fixture in Japan, which takes place between teams from Osaka Prefecture. Currently the derby is contested by Cerezo Osaka (based in Osaka) and Gamba Osaka (based in Suita).

History
In the 1970s, Yanmar Diesel, co-founder of the Japan Soccer League in 1965, had its reserve squad, Yanmar Club, play in the JSL's Second Division. At the end of 1979, the reserve club was closed by the parent company. Most of its players and staff found refuge when Matsushita Electric Industrial took them in with the aim of forming a new club to compete in the JSL. The new Matsushita Electric SC was formed initially playing in Nara and over the years began moving into Osaka for games.

The two clubs met in the 1982 and 1984 Emperor's Cups – both won by Yanmar – before their first league meeting during the 1986–87 season. At the time, newcomers Matsushita Electric struggled and ended up being relegated; they did not return until 1988–89 season. At the end of 1990–91 season, Yanmar lost top division status for the first time. Matsushita Electric, who had already applied to take part in the new J.League, was chosen instead to be the representative of Osaka in the new league, taking the name Gamba Osaka.

After competing for three seasons in the old Japan Football League, Yanmar Diesel, which had taken the name Cerezo Osaka in 1994, was promoted to the J. League. Since then, both clubs meet in every top division season except in 2002, 2007 to 2009, and 2015 to 2016, when Cerezo competed in second division, as well as in 2013, when Gamba did the same.

Results and statistics

Overview

Japan Soccer League

J.League/J.League Division 1/J1 League

Emperor's Cup

J.League Cup

AFC Champions League

Pre-season matches

Honours

Records

Highest attendance
League
42,723 people – 12 April 2014 at Nagai Stadium, J.League Division 1

Lowest attendance
The figures below not including the matches held behind closed doors due to the COVID-19 pandemic in Japan.
League
7,210 people – 14 September 1996 at Expo '70 Stadium, J.League
Other
5,120 people – 20 December 2003 at Ehime Prefectural General Athletic Park Stadium, Emperor's Cup

Hat-tricks
Gamba Osaka
Masashi Oguro – 2 October 2004 at Expo '70 Stadium, J.League Division 1
Eldis Fernando Damasio – 12 March 2006 at Nagai Stadium, J.League Division 1
Magno Alves – 12 March 2006 at Nagai Stadium, J.League Division 1
Cerezo Osaka
None yet

Players who have played for both clubs
Tomoo Kudaka (G: 1981–1993, C: 1994–1995)
Daisuke Saito (G: 1997–1999, C: 2000–2002)
Yuji Hironaga (G: 1998–1999, C: 2003–2004)
Hiroshige Yanagimoto (G: 1999–2002, C: 2003–2006)
Motohiro Yoshida (G: 2003–2004, C: 2005–2007)
Akira Kaji (C: 1998–1999, G: 2006–2014)
Ryūji Bando (G: 1998–1999, 2006–2009, C: 2010–2013)
Akihiro Ienaga (G: 2004–2007, 2012–2013, C: 2010)
Shu Kurata (G: 2007–2009, 2012–, C: 2011)
Adriano (C: 2010, G: 2011)
Arata Kodama (G: 2001–2005, C: 2012)
Yohei Takeda (G: 2012, C: 2013)
Toru Araiba (G: 1998–2003, C: 2013–2014)
Sota Nakazawa (G: 2007–2012, C: 2015–2016)
Hideo Hashimoto (G: 1998–2011, C: 2015–2016)

References

Gamba Osaka
Cerezo Osaka
Football in Osaka
Japan football derbies